Ken Asaeda (born 27 July 1983) is a German footballer who played in the 2. Bundesliga for SV Waldhof Mannheim. Born in Mannheim, Germany, but a national of Japan, Asaeda is known as a midfielder.

References

External links

1983 births
Living people
Footballers from Mannheim
German people of Japanese descent
German footballers
Japanese footballers
SV Waldhof Mannheim players
Fortuna Düsseldorf players
Wuppertaler SV players
KSV Hessen Kassel players
Rot-Weiß Oberhausen players
SV Eintracht Trier 05 players
3. Liga players
2. Bundesliga players
Association football midfielders